Newmarket is a market town and civil parish in the West Suffolk district of Suffolk, England. Located (14 miles) west of Bury St Edmunds and (14 miles) northeast of Cambridge. It is considered the birthplace and global centre of thoroughbred horse racing. It is a major local business cluster, with annual investment rivalling that of the Cambridge Science Park, the other major cluster in the region. It is the largest racehorse training centre in Britain, the largest racehorse breeding centre in the country, home to most major British horseracing institutions, and a key global centre for horse health. Two Classic races, and an additional three British Champions Series races are held at Newmarket every year. The town has had close royal connections since the time of James I, who built a palace there, and was also a base for Charles I, Charles II, and most monarchs since. Elizabeth II visited the town often to see her horses in training.

Newmarket has over fifty horse training stables, two large racetracks, the Rowley Mile and the July Course, and one of the most extensive and prestigious horse training grounds in the world. The town is home to over 3,500 racehorses, and it is estimated that one in every three local jobs is related to horse racing. Palace House, the National Heritage Centre for Horseracing and Sporting Art, the National Horseracing Museum, Tattersalls racehorse auctioneers, and two of the world's foremost equine hospitals for horse health, are in the town, which is surrounded by over sixty horse breeding studs. On account of its leading position in the multibillion-pound horse racing and breeding industry, it is also a major export centre.

History

Newmarket's name was first recorded in Latin as novo mercato in 1219 (according to The National Archives, Feet of Fines CP25/1/23/9). The Novum Forum c.1200 recorded in many place-name dictionaries such as that by Mills, is an error; this was actually the surname de novo foro of a man from Yorkshire who had no connection to Newmarket. In 1223, Richard de Argentein was granted licence to hold an annual fair in Newmarket (from The National Archives, Henry III Fine Roll C60/18).

James I first visited Newmarket in February 1605, describing it as a "poor little village". From 1606 to 1610, he built the Newmarket Palace, an estate covering  of land from the High Street to All Saints' churchyard, and thus established the town as a royal resort. This also made Newmarket a horseracing town. The first palace building suffered from subsidence and sank on one side when King James was in residence in March 1613. Simon Basil, and later, Inigo Jones, were commissioned to build new lodgings for the King and the Prince of Wales. Jones's design had three storeys and was Italianate in style.

In 1642, Charles I met a parliamentary deputation in Newmarket that demanded his surrender of the armed forces. "By God not for an hour", Charles replied, "You have asked such of me that was never asked of a King!" This effectively started the English Civil War. Newmarket remained Royalist throughout the war. In early June 1647, Charles was captured at Holdenby House in Northamptonshire and brought to Newmarket as a prisoner. He was placed under house arrest in the palace while the whole of Cromwell's New Model Army kept guard over the town. A survey in 1649 showed that the palace was in disrepair. The following year, the palace was sold to John Okey (one of the regicides), who demolished most of the buildings.

Between 1666 and 1685, Charles II often visited Newmarket. In 1668, he commissioned William Samwell to build a new palace on the High Street (on the site of the present United Reformed Church). However, in 1670, John Evelyn said that the palace was "meane enough, and hardly capable for a hunting house, let alone a royal palace!" In October 1677 and October 1695, William of Orange visited Newmarket.

At the start of the 19th century, the palace was largely torn down, but a part survives and is now named Palace House. During the 1800s, Newmarket south of the High Street spread into the parishes of Woodditton and Cheveley in Cambridgeshire. In 1894, the county border was moved to accommodate this, and has been further altered since.

On 15 December 1977, an F111-F jet fighter crashed at Exning near Newmarket, owing to hydraulic failure.

Aired on the 12th February 2012, the British television series Time Team excavated on the site of Charles II's palace at Newmarket, and found foundations of racehorse stables.

Geography and governance

The area of Suffolk containing Newmarket is nearly an exclave, with only a narrow strip of territory linking it to the rest of the county. There are three tiers of local government covering Newmarket, at parish (town), district, and county level: Newmarket Town Council, West Suffolk District Council, and Suffolk County Council.

The town lies in the Parliamentary constituency of West Suffolk, which since 2010 has been represented by Conservative MP Matt Hancock.

Administrative history

Historically the town was split between parishes and counties, with one parish - St Mary - in Suffolk, and the other - All Saints - in Cambridgeshire. The boundary between the two parishes followed the High Street through the middle of the town, with St Mary's parish and Suffolk to the north, and All Saints' parish and Cambridgeshire to the south. In 1851 a local board of health was established to govern the town, with its territory covering the two Newmarket parishes and parts of the neighbouring parishes of Exning (Suffolk) and Woodditton (Cambridgeshire).

The Local Government Act 1888 established county councils, and directed that urban sanitary districts such as Newmarket Local Board should not straddle county boundaries. As such, the whole local board district was brought within West Suffolk on 1 April 1889. The Local Government Act 1894 established elected parish and district councils, with Newmarket Local Board becoming Newmarket Urban District Council on 31 December 1894. Newmarket Urban District Council held its first meeting on 31 December 1894 at the Town Hall at 29 High Street, a converted theatre which had previously been used by the old local board for meetings. The first chairman of the urban district council was Joseph Rogers, who had been the last chairman of the local board. On 1 October 1895 the urban district was enlarged by absorbing the rest of Exning parish and additional areas from Woodditton parish (the latter being added to the civil parish of Newmarket All Saints). Thereafter Newmarket Urban District covered three civil parishes: Newmarket St Mary, Newmarket All Saints, and Exning. These were urban parishes and so did not have parish councils of their own, but were directly administered by Newmarket Urban District Council.

The urban district council was based at the Town Hall at 29 High Street until 1922, when it moved to Godolphin House at 2 The Avenue, and sold the Town Hall to be converted into commercial premises. By 1937 the council had moved its main offices to Stratford House at 29 Old Station Road, but continued to use Godolphin House for some departments. Around 1948 the council acquired Severals House at 3 Bury Road, which then served as its offices and meeting place until the council's abolition in 1974. Newmarket Urban District Council was granted a coat of arms on 15 November 1951.

The Local Government Commission for England suggested in the 1960s that the border around Newmarket could be altered in West Suffolk's favour. Conversely, the 1972 Local Government Bill, as originally proposed, would have transferred the town (and Haverhill) to Cambridgeshire. Newmarket Urban District Council supported the move to Cambridgeshire, but ultimately the government decided to withdraw this proposal and keep the existing boundary, despite lobbying from the Urban District Council.

Newmarket Urban District was abolished under the Local Government Act 1972, merging with neighbouring Mildenhall Rural District to become Forest Heath District on 1 April 1974. No successor parish was created for the former urban district, and so it became an unparished area, remaining unparished until 1999 when the area was split between two parishes called Newmarket and Exning, with the parish council for Newmarket adopting the name Newmarket Town Council. Forest Heath District Council had its main offices at Mildenhall. Forest Heath merged with neighbouring St Edmundsbury in 2019 to become West Suffolk, administered from Bury St Edmunds.

Connections to horse racing and training

Racing at Newmarket has been dated as far back as 1174, making it the earliest known racing venue of post-classical times. King James I (reigned 1603–1625) greatly increased the popularity of horse racing there, and King Charles I followed this by inaugurating the first cup race in 1634. The Jockey Club's clubhouse is in Newmarket, though its administration is based in London.

Stables and training industry

Around 3,000 race horses are stabled in and around Newmarket. By comparison, the human population is of the order of 15,000 and it is estimated that one in three jobs are connected to horseracing in one way or another. Newmarket has 3 main sections of Heath, all of which are used to train the racehorses on. The grassland of Newmarket's training grounds has been developed over hundreds of years of careful maintenance, and is generally regarded as some of the finest in the world. "Racecourse side" is located next to the Rowley Mile Racecourse and is a predominately flat area. "Warren Hill" overlooks the town and consists of 3 all weather canters and a multitude of grass canters. "Bury Side" is the name given to the area located near the Bury Road and the railway line. These areas and the surrounding heath is chalk downland and has special birds and animals only suited to this terrain. It is also a very historical area with the remains of 6th century living. This hill is part of the chalk formation the Newmarket Ridge.

Most of the Newmarket-based racing stables are situated in the centre of the town, where they can easily access the gallops. The town has special horse routes so the horses can reach the gallops safely from the many training establishments occupied by top trainers. Many of the world's most successful trainers are based in Newmarket, Sir Michael Stoute who is based at Freemason Lodge, John Gosden, based at Clarehaven Stables, Saeed bin Suroor, based at Stanley House Stables and Charlie Appleby based at Moulton Paddocks. Millions of pounds of prize money are won by these trainers alone around the world each year. Many of the horses they train are worth over a million pounds, with some of the finest being worth between £5 million and £50 million or higher. Outside the town the land-use is dominated by thoroughbred breeding, studs occupying large areas in every direction. Around 70 licensed trainers and more than 60 stud farms operate in and around Newmarket.

Newmarket has three major public horse exercise grounds: Warren Hill (including the Long Hill exercise grounds), Racecourse Side (situated between and alongside Newmarket Racecourses's Rowley Mile and July Courses), and the Limekilns (include the Al Bahatri all-weather grounds). Godolphin also operate two large private horse exercise grounds near their Godolphin Stables and Moulton Paddocks stables.

Horse racing

The town has two race courses situated on Newmarket Heath, The Rowley Mile and The July Course. The Rowley Mile is the home of Newmarket's two Classic races, the 2,000 Guineas and the 1,000 Guineas, two of the world's most prestigious races, run in the first weekend of May every year. The value of the winners of these races are often immediately increases by millions of pounds. It is also the home of Future Champions Day, run the weekend before Champions Day at Ascot, which includes the very important Dewhurst Stakes. The July Course is the home of the July Cup, the Falmouth Stakes and a number of other very important races. The two courses are separated by the Devil's Dyke.

Horse breeding

Newmarket is the UK centre for the multibillion-pound racehorse breeding industry, and a key global centre of the business. Thoroughbred breeding lines are a core part of success in global horse racing, and key stallions are controlled by major global breeding operations, which operate studs around the town. Darley Stud, owners of New Approach, Cape Cross, Dubawi, Sepoy and Raven's Pass own large areas of land to the south of the town. Shadwell Stud, another major global operation, have a number of studs nearby and own Nayef, Sakhee, Haafhd and Eswarah. Juddmonte Farms, owner of Frankel, Observatory, Dansili, Champs Elysees and Three Valleys, also have a large stud nearby. Cheveley Park Stud, owners of Pivotal, Mayson and Medicean are based next to the town, as are Lanwades Stud, owners of Aussie Rules, Hernando and Sir Percy. Newsells Park Stud, owners of Equiano and The Royal Studs, owners of Motivator also operate there. In 1967 Queen Elizabeth II opened The National Stud, a breeding centre for thoroughbred horses. Other parts of the town are also surrounded by some of the world's largest and most successful horse breeding studs.

Horse health and welfare

The town is home to two of the most advanced equine hospitals in the world, the Newmarket Equine Hospital and Rossdales.

Museums of horse racing

Newmarket is home to Britain's National Heritage Centre for Horseracing and Sporting Art at Palace House, the National Horseracing Museum, the Sporting Art Trust and a base of Retraining of Racehorses.

Food and drink

Newmarket sausages
The town is home to the PGI Protected Newmarket sausage. Produced since the 1880s, three local butchers in the town are entitled to produce these unique flavoured sausages.

The sausages are given as a prize for the Newmarket Town Plate held each year in the town at Newmarket racecourse.

Culture and community

Newmarket's key role in sport for many centuries has made it a centre for many of Britain's finest sporting painters. The development of painting on sporting themes in the early eighteenth century was centred on the Newmarket Racecourse and the three founders of the sporting school, John Wootton, James Seymour and Peter Tillemans, painted many scenes of the racecourse and its environs. Newmarket is also the setting for some of Sir Alfred Munnings's most famous paintings.

The Save Historic Newmarket group, an organisation dedicated to maintaining the town's unique heritage as the world headquarters of racing, has become increasingly vocal in recent years. The group, composed of local residents, supports sustainable development in the town and aims to make Newmarket a more attractive destination for visitors.

Transport
Newmarket railway station is on the Ipswich-Ely line, formerly belonging to the Great Eastern Railway (later part of the London & North Eastern Railway). Newmarket's first railway was a line built by the Newmarket and Chesterford Railway and opened in 1848 (known as the "Newmarket Railway"). There was an attractive terminus in Newmarket, with intermediate stations at Bourne Bridge, Balsham Road and Six Mile Bottom.

Three years later the first  or so of this line, the stretch from Great Chesterford to Six Mile Bottom, was superseded by a more viable section linking Six Mile Bottom directly with Cambridge, and so the Great Chesterford – Six Mile Bottom section closed in 1851, one of the earliest closures in British railway history (the former Bourne Bridge station is believed to have been partly incorporated into a public house just across the road from a station opened later on another line - Pampisford, on the now-closed Cambridge - Haverhill - Sudbury route). With the development of other rail lines the Newmarket terminus was replaced by the present through station in 1902; it was used as a goods station until 1967 and demolished in 1980.

A short distance to the north east is the 1,100-yard Warren Hill tunnel. North of the tunnel, a separate station, Warren Hill, was built for raceday use.

Regular bus services run to the neighbouring towns of Bury St Edmunds, Cambridge, Ely and Mildenhall. Various National Express coach services serve the town: London (Victoria Coach Station) to Great Yarmouth and Lowestoft; Norwich to Stansted, Heathrow and Gatwick Airports; and the cross country Clacton-on-Sea to Liverpool service which travels via Cambridge, Peterborough, Leicester, Nottingham, Sheffield and Manchester. In late 2006, Newmarket introduced a Park and Ride service running from Studlands industrial estate to the town centre, which was replaced by an hourly bus route, the number 11 (formerly number 10), whilst at the same time parking charges were introduced to the town.

Education
Newmarket has a number of primary schools which feed into the 11–18 Newmarket Academy, the town's only secondary school. The town is also home to an Air Training Corps Squadron (2417 Newmarket Squadron) and an Army Cadet Detachment.

Sport and leisure
Newmarket has two racecourses, The Rowley Mile and The July Course, and is home to 3,000 thoroughbred racehorses and over 70 racehorse trainers. The local football team is Newmarket Town. In 2005–06 the club reached the quarter finals of the FA Vase. Newmarket Hockey Club play field hockey, and Newmarket Cycling and Triathlon club is an amateur cycling club in the town.

A greyhound racing track, was opened around the Cricket Field Road Ground, the venue used by Newmarket Town FC. The racing was independent (not affiliated to the sports governing body the National Greyhound Racing Club) known as a flapping track, which was the nickname given to independent tracks. The track was active shortly after World War II and is known to have also been active during 1967. The date of closure is not known. An earlier instance of racing took place in 1933 at a venue described as the Duchess Drive Stadium.

Notable people

Famous residents of Newmarket include Austin James, jockeys Frankie Dettori, William Buick, Ryan Moore and Tom Queally as well as trainers Sir Michael Stoute, John Gosden, James Fanshawe, Saeed bin Suroor, Charlie Appleby, and Marco Botti and former West Indian cricketer Michael Holding.

Many wealthy owners of racing stables and studs have also lived in Newmarket, including David Robinson, David Thompson, Rachel Parsons and Lester Piggott.

Newmarket is the birthplace of the following people.
William Thomas Tutte (1917–2002), mathematician and World War II cryptoanalyst (celebrated by a memorial installed in 2014 outside the Rutland Arms Hotel)
Thomas Elsdon Ashford VC (1859–1913), recipient of the Victoria Cross during the Second Anglo-Afghan War
Ross Edgar (born 1983), 2008 Olympics cycling Silver Medalist
Dina Carroll (born 1968), Brit Award winner
Jamie Paul "JJ" Hamblett (born 1988), singer from Union J, previously worked for Newmarket trainer John Gosden.

Twin towns

  Lexington, Kentucky, US
  Maisons-Laffitte, France
  Le Mesnil-le-Roi, France

See also

 Lambourn and Malton - two other major racehorse training centres in England.
 Newmarket sausage
 Newmarket, Ontario

References

External links

 Newmarket Town Council
 Discover Newmarket
 Visit Newmarket 
 Newmarket Journal - Newmarket's weekly newspaper
 Newmarket Weekly News

 
Towns in Suffolk
Market towns in Suffolk
Horse racing in Great Britain
Civil parishes in Suffolk
Forest Heath